Cassius Chaney (born June 7, 1987) is an American professional boxer who has held the WBC-USNBC Silver heavyweight title since 2019.

Education
Chaney attended Old Saybrook Senior High School where he was a star basketball player. Chaney was twice named all-state, leading the team to a state championship in 2005.
He then went on to play basketball at University of New Haven.

Professional career
Chaney made his professional debut on April 17, 2015, scoring a second-round technical knockout (TKO) over Perry Filkins at the Mohegan Sun Casino in Uncasville, Connecticut.

After compiling a record of 17–0 (11 KOs), he defeated Nick Jones via third-round knockout (KO) to capture the WBC-USNBC Silver heavyweight title on November 27, 2019, at the Castleton Banquet & Conference Center in Windham, New Hampshire.

Professional boxing record

References

Living people
1987 births
American male boxers
Boxers from Baltimore
Heavyweight boxers